QMK is an open-source firmware for microcontrollers that control computer keyboards.

Description 
VIA is a software program that can be used to configure keyboards that run QMK. It can swap keys and implement macros into the keyboard.

References

External links 
 
 

Open-source firmware